Qajar Mohammad Hasan (also Romanized as Qajar Moḩammad Ḩasan) is a village in Dust Mohammad Rural District, in the Central District of Hirmand County, Sistan and Baluchestan Province, Iran. At the 2006 census, its population was 428, in 84 families.

References 

Populated places in Hirmand County